FC Salyut Saratov is a Russian football team from Saratov. It played professionally from 1994 to 2001. Their best result was 14th place in Zone Privolzhye of the Russian Second Division in 1999.

External links
  Team history at KLISF

Association football clubs established in 1965
Football clubs in Russia
Sport in Saratov
1965 establishments in Russia